Global assets under management consists of assets held by asset management firms, pension funds, sovereign wealth funds, hedge funds, and private equity funds.

Assets by classification 
 AM — Asset Management Firm
 FOREX — Foreign Exchange Reserves
 HF — Hedge Fund
 MF — (Exchange Traded) Mutual Fund
 PEN — Pension Fund
 PE — Private Equity Firm
 SWF — Sovereign Wealth Fund
 UHNWI — (Billionaire) Ultra High-Net-Worth Individual

 Around one third of private wealth is incorporated in conventional investment management (Pension funds, Mutual funds and Insurance assets).
  Many surveys systematically overestimate the global wealth pool. This is because they fail to separate out assets that are inaccessible for wealth management services (e.g. pension assets, real estate, dedicated liquidity, etc.)

Assets by Region

Assets by company

See also
Assets under management

References

Sources
IMF - Global asset allocation
TheCityUK - Fund management
Morgan Stanley - World's $165 trillion worth of traded securities
 http://www.sovereigninvestor.org  The Sovereign Investment Council, a trade group for sovereign investors and financial firms that serve sovereign investment funds.

Finance lists
Investment management